The Max Planck Society for the Advancement of Science (abbreviated MPG) is a formally independent non-governmental and non-profit association of German research institutes. Founded in 1911 as the Kaiser Wilhelm Society, it was renamed to the Max Planck Society in 1948 in honor of its former president, theoretical physicist Max Planck. The society is funded by the federal and state governments of Germany.

Mission
According to its primary goal, the Max Planck Society supports fundamental research in the natural, life and social sciences, the arts and humanities in its 86 (as of December 2018) Max Planck Institutes. The society has a total staff of approximately 17,000 permanent employees, including 5,470 scientists, plus around 4,600 non-tenured scientists and guests. The society's budget for 2018 was about €1.8 billion. As of 31 December 2018, the Max Planck Society employed a total of 23,767 staff, of whom 15,650 were scientists. 44.4% were female employees and 31.5% of all of the employees were foreign nationals.

The Max Planck Society has a world-leading reputation as a science and technology research organization, with 38 Nobel Prizes awarded to their scientists, and is widely regarded as one of the foremost basic research organizations in the world. In 2020, the Nature Index placed the Max Planck Institutes third worldwide in terms of research published in Nature journals (after the Chinese Academy of Sciences and Harvard University). In terms of total research volume (unweighted by citations or impact), the Max Planck Society is only outranked by the Chinese Academy of Sciences, the Russian Academy of Sciences and Harvard University in the Times Higher Education institutional rankings. The Thomson Reuters-Science Watch website placed the Max Planck Society as the second leading research organization worldwide following Harvard University in terms of the impact of the produced research over science fields.

The Max Planck Society and its predecessor Kaiser Wilhelm Society hosted several renowned scientists in their fields, including Otto Hahn, Werner Heisenberg, and Albert Einstein.

History

The organization was established in 1911 as the Kaiser Wilhelm Society, or Kaiser-Wilhelm-Gesellschaft (KWG), a non-governmental research organization named for the then German emperor. The KWG was one of the world's leading research organizations; its board of directors included scientists like Walther Bothe, Peter Debye, Albert Einstein, and Fritz Haber. In 1946, Otto Hahn assumed the position of president of KWG, and in 1948, the society was renamed the Max Planck Society (MPG) after its former president (1930–37) Max Planck, who died in 1947.

The Max Planck Society has a world-leading reputation as a science and technology research organization. In 2006, the Times Higher Education Supplement rankings of non-university research institutions (based on international peer review by academics) placed the Max Planck Society as No.1 in the world for science research, and No.3 in technology research (behind AT&T Corporation and the Argonne National Laboratory in the United States).

The domain mpg.de attracted at least 1.7 million visitors annually by 2008 according to a Compete.com study.

List of presidents of the KWG and the MPG
 Adolf von Harnack (1911–1930)
 Max Planck (1930–1937)
 Carl Bosch (1937–1940)
 Albert Vögler (1941–1945)
 Max Planck (16 May 1945 – 31 March 1946)
 Otto Hahn (as President of the KWG 1946 and then as Founder and President of the MPG 1948–1960)
 Adolf Butenandt (1960–1972)
 Reimar Lüst (1972–1984)
 Heinz Staab (1984–1990)
 Hans F. Zacher (1990–1996)
 Hubert Markl (1996–2002)
 Peter Gruss (2002–2014)
 Martin Stratmann (2014–present)

Max Planck Research Award
From 1990 to 2004, the "Max Planck Research Award for International Cooperation" was presented to several researchers from a wide range of disciplines each year.

From 2004 to 2017, the "Max Planck Research Award" was conferred annually to two internationally renowned scientists, one of whom was working in Germany and one in another country. Calls for nominations for the award were invited on an annually rotating basis in specific sub-areas of the natural sciences and engineering, the life sciences, and the human and social sciences. The objective of the Max Planck Society and the Alexander von Humboldt Foundation in presenting this joint research award was to give added momentum to specialist fields that were either not yet established in Germany or that deserved to be expanded.

Since 2018, the award has been succeeded by the "Max Planck-Humboldt Research Award", annually awarded to an internationally renowned mid-career researcher with outstanding future potential from outside Germany but having a strong interest in a research residency in Germany for limited time periods, alternately in the fields of natural and engineering sciences, human sciences, and life sciences, as well as the "Max Planck-Humboldt Medal" awarded to other two finalists.

Max Planck-Humboldt Research Award

Max Planck Research Award

Max Planck Research Award for International Cooperation
See :de:Max-Planck-Forschungspreis

Organization

The Max Planck Society is formally an eingetragener Verein, a registered association with the institute directors as scientific members having equal voting rights. The society has its registered seat in Berlin, while the administrative headquarters are located in Munich. Since June 2014, materials scientist Martin Stratmann has been the President of the Max Planck Society.

Funding is provided predominantly from federal and state sources, but also from research and license fees and donations. One of the larger donations was the castle Schloss Ringberg near Kreuth in Bavaria, which was pledged by Luitpold Emanuel in Bayern (Duke in Bavaria). It passed to the Society after the duke died in 1973, and is now used for conferences.

Max Planck Institutes and research groups

The Max Planck Society consists of over 80 research institutes. In addition, the society funds a number of Max Planck Research Groups (MPRG) and International Max Planck Research Schools (IMPRS). The purpose of establishing independent research groups at various universities is to strengthen the required networking between universities and institutes of the Max Planck Society.

The research units are primarily located across Europe with a few in South Korea and the U.S. In 2007, the Society established its first non-European centre, with an institute on the Jupiter campus of Florida Atlantic University focusing on neuroscience.

The Max Planck Institutes operate independently from, though in close cooperation with, the universities, and focus on innovative research which does not fit into the university structure due to their interdisciplinary or transdisciplinary nature or which require resources that cannot be met by the state universities.

Internally, Max Planck Institutes are organized into research departments headed by directors such that each MPI has several directors, a position roughly comparable to anything from full professor to department head at a university. Other core members include Junior and Senior Research Fellows.

In addition, there are several associated institutes:

Max Planck Society also has a collaborative center with Princeton University—Max Planck Princeton Research Center for Plasma Physics—located in Princeton, New Jersey, in the U.S. The latest Max Planck Research Center has been established at Harvard University in 2016 as the Max Planck Harvard Research Center for the Archaeoscience of the Ancient Mediterranean.

International Max Planck Research Schools
Together with the Association of Universities and other Education Institutions in Germany, the Max Planck Society established numerous International Max Planck Research Schools (IMPRS) to promote junior scientists:
 Cologne Graduate School of Ageing Research, Cologne
 International Max Planck Research School for Intelligent Systems, at the Max Planck Institute for Intelligent Systems located in Tübingen and Stuttgart
 International Max Planck Research School on Adapting Behavior in a Fundamentally Uncertain World (Uncertainty School), at the Max Planck Institutes for Economics, for Human Development, and/or Research on Collective Goods
 International Max Planck Research School for Analysis, Design and Optimization in Chemical and Biochemical Process Engineering, Magdeburg 
 International Max Planck Research School for Astronomy and Cosmic Physics, Heidelberg at the MPI for Astronomy
 International Max Planck Research School for Astrophysics, Garching at the MPI for Astrophysics
 International Max Planck Research School for Complex Surfaces in Material Sciences, Berlin
 International Max Planck Research School for Computer Science, Saarbrücken
 International Max Planck Research School for Earth System Modeling, Hamburg
 International Max Planck Research School for Elementary Particle Physics, Munich, at the MPI for Physics
 International Max Planck Research School for Environmental, Cellular and Molecular Microbiology, Marburg at the Max Planck Institute for Terrestrial Microbiology
 International Max Planck Research School for Evolutionary Biology, Plön at the Max Planck Institute for Evolutionary Biology
 International Max Planck Research School "From Molecules to Organisms", Tübingen at the Max Planck Institute for Developmental Biology
 International Max Planck Research School for Global Biogeochemical Cycles, Jena at the Max Planck Institute for Biogeochemistry
 International Max Planck Research School on Gravitational Wave Astronomy, Hannover and Potsdam MPI for Gravitational Physics
 International Max Planck Research School for Heart and Lung Research, Bad Nauheim at the Max Planck Institute for Heart and Lung Research
International Max Planck Research School for Infectious Diseases and Immunity, Berlin at the Max Planck Institute for Infection Biology
 International Max Planck Research School for Language Sciences, Nijmegen
 International Max Planck Research School for Neurosciences, Göttingen
 International Max Planck Research School for Cognitive and Systems Neuroscience, Tübingen
 International Max Planck Research School for Marine Microbiology (MarMic), joint program of the Max Planck Institute for Marine Microbiology in Bremen, the University of Bremen, the Alfred Wegener Institute for Polar and Marine Research in Bremerhaven, and the Jacobs University Bremen
 International Max Planck Research School for Maritime Affairs, Hamburg
 International Max Planck Research School for Molecular and Cellular Biology, Freiburg
 International Max Planck Research School for Molecular and Cellular Life Sciences, Munich
 International Max Planck Research School for Molecular Biology, Göttingen
 International Max Planck Research School for Molecular Cell Biology and Bioengineering, Dresden
 International Max Planck Research School Molecular Biomedicine, program combined with the 'Graduate Programm Cell Dynamics And Disease' at the University of Münster and the Max Planck Institute for Molecular Biomedicine
 International Max Planck Research School on Multiscale Bio-Systems, Potsdam
 International Max Planck Research School for Organismal Biology, at the University of Konstanz and the Max Planck Institute for Ornithology
 International Max Planck Research School on Reactive Structure Analysis for Chemical Reactions (IMPRS RECHARGE), Mülheim an der Ruhr, at the Max Planck Institute for Chemical Energy Conversion
 International Max Planck Research School for Science and Technology of Nano-Systems, Halle at Max Planck Institute of Microstructure Physics
 International Max Planck Research School for Solar System Science at the University of Göttingen hosted by MPI for Solar System Research
 International Max Planck Research School for Astronomy and Astrophysics, Bonn, at the MPI for Radio Astronomy (formerly the International Max Planck Research School for Radio and Infrared Astronomy)
 International Max Planck Research School for the Social and Political Constitution of the Economy, Cologne
 International Max Planck Research School for Surface and Interface Engineering in Advanced Materials, Düsseldorf at Max Planck Institute for Iron Research GmbH
 International Max Planck Research School for Ultrafast Imaging and Structural Dynamics, Hamburg

Max Planck Schools 
 Max Planck School of Cognition 
 Max Planck School Matter to Life 
 Max Planck School of Photonics

Max Planck Center 
 The Max Planck Centre for Attosecond Science (MPC-AS), POSTECH Pohang
 The Max Planck POSTECH Center for Complex Phase Materials, POSTECH Pohang

Max Planck Institutes
Among others:
 Max Planck Florida Institute for Neuroscience
 Max Planck Institute for Neurobiology of Behavior – caesar, Bonn
Max Planck Institute for Aeronomics in Katlenburg-Lindau was renamed to Max Planck Institute for Solar System Research in 2004;
 Max Planck Institute for Biology in Tübingen was closed in 2005;
 Max Planck Institute for Cell Biology in Ladenburg b. Heidelberg was closed in 2003;
 Max Planck Institute for Economics in Jena was renamed to the Max Planck Institute for the Science of Human History in 2014;
 Max Planck Institute for Ionospheric Research in Katlenburg-Lindau was renamed to Max Planck Institute for Aeronomics in 1958;
 Max Planck Institute for Metals Research, Stuttgart
 Max Planck Institute of Oceanic Biology in Wilhelmshaven was renamed to Max Planck Institute of Cell Biology in 1968 and moved to Ladenburg 1977;
 Max Planck Institute for Psychological Research in Munich merged into the Max Planck Institute for Human Cognitive and Brain Sciences in 2004;
 Max Planck Institute for Protein and Leather Research in Regensburg moved to Munich 1957 and was united with the Max Planck Institute for Biochemistry in 1977;
 Max Planck Institute for Virus Research in Tübingen was renamed as Max Planck Institute for Developmental Biology in 1985;
 Max Planck Institute for the Study of the Scientific-Technical World in Starnberg (from 1970 until 1981 (closed)) directed by Carl Friedrich von Weizsäcker and Jürgen Habermas.
Max Planck Institute for Behavioral Physiology
Max Planck Institute of Experimental Endocrinology
Max Planck Institute for Foreign and International Social Law
Max Planck Institute for Physics and Astrophysics
Max Planck Research Unit for Enzymology of Protein Folding

Open access publishing 

The Max Planck Society describes itself as "a co-founder of the international Open Access movement". Together with the European Cultural Heritage Online Project the Max Planck Society organized the Berlin Open Access Conference in October 2003 to ratify the Bethesda Statement on Open Access Publishing. At the Conference the Berlin Declaration on Open Access to Knowledge in the Sciences and Humanities was passed. The Berlin Declaration built on previous open access declarations, but widened the research field to be covered by open access to include humanities and called for new activities to support open access such as “encouraging the holders of cultural heritage” to provide open access to their resources.

The Max Planck Society continues to support open access in Germany and mandates institutional self-archiving of research outputs on the eDoc server and publications by its researchers in open access journals within 12 months. To finance open access the Max Planck Society established the Max Planck Digital Library. The library also aims to improve the conditions for open access on behalf of all Max Planck Institutes by negotiating contracts with open access publishers and developing infrastructure projects, such as the Max Planck open access repository.

Criticism

Pay for PhD students 
In 2008, the European General Court ruled in a case brought by a PhD student against the Max Planck Society that "a researcher preparing a doctoral thesis on the basis of a grant contract concluded with the Max-Planck-Gesellschaft zur Förderung der Wissenschaften eV, must be regarded as a worker within the meaning of Article 39 EC only if his activities are performed for a certain period of time under the direction of an institute forming part of that association and if, in return for those activities, he receives remuneration".

In 2012, the Max Planck Society was at the centre of a controversy about some PhD students being given employment contracts. Of the 5,300 students who at the time wrote their PhD thesis at the 80 Max Planck Institutes 2,000 had an employment contract. The remaining 3,300 received grants of between 1,000 and 1,365 Euro. According to a 2011 statement by the Max Planck Society "As you embark on a PhD, you are still anything but a proper scientist; it’s during the process itself that you become a proper scientist... a PhD is an apprenticeship in the lab, and as such it is usually not paid like a proper job – and this is, by and large, the practice at all research institutions and universities". The allegation of wage dumping for young scientists was discussed during the passing of the 2012 "Wissenschaftsfreiheitsgesetz" (Scientific Freedom Law) in the German Parliament.

Nobel Laureates

Max-Planck-Society (since 1948)

 Svante Pääbo, Nobel Prize, medicine 2022
 Benjamin List, Nobel Prize, chemistry 2021
 Klaus Hasselmann, Nobel Prize, physics 2021
 Emmanuelle Charpentier, Nobel Prize, chemistry 2020
 Reinhard Genzel, Nobel Prize, physics 2020
 Stefan W. Hell, Nobel Prize, chemistry 2014
 Gerhard Ertl, Nobel Prize, chemistry 2007
 Theodor W. Hänsch, Nobel Prize, physics 2005
 Christiane Nüsslein-Volhard, Nobel Prize, medicine 1995
 Paul Crutzen, Nobel Prize, chemistry 1995
 Erwin Neher, Nobel Prize, medicine 1991
 Bert Sakmann, Nobel Prize, medicine 1991
 Robert Huber, Nobel Prize, chemistry 1988
 Hartmut Michel, Nobel Prize, chemistry 1988
 Johann Deisenhofer, Nobel Prize, chemistry 1988
 Ernst Ruska, Nobel Prize, physics 1986
 Klaus von Klitzing, Nobel Prize, physics 1985
 Georges Köhler, Nobel Prize, medicine 1984
 Konrad Lorenz, Nobel Prize, medicine 1973
 Manfred Eigen, Nobel Prize, chemistry 1967
 Feodor Lynen, Nobel Prize, medicine 1964
 Karl Ziegler, Nobel Prize, chemistry 1963
 Walter Bothe, Nobel Prize, physics 1954

Kaiser-Wilhelm-Society (1914–1948)
 Otto Hahn, Nobel Prize, chemistry 1944
 Adolf Butenandt, Nobel Prize, chemistry 1939
 Richard Kuhn, Nobel Prize, chemistry 1938
 Peter J. W. Debye, Nobel Prize, chemistry 1936
 Hans Spemann, Nobel Prize, medicine 1935
 Werner Heisenberg, Nobel Prize, physics 1932
 Otto Heinrich Warburg, Nobel Prize, medicine 1931
 Carl Bosch, Nobel Prize, chemistry 1931
 James Franck, Nobel Prize, physics 1925
 Otto Meyerhof, Nobel Prize, medicine 1922
 Albert Einstein, Nobel Prize, physics 1921
 Max Planck, Nobel Prize, physics 1918
 Fritz Haber, Nobel Prize, chemistry 1918
 Richard Willstätter, Nobel Prize, chemistry 1915
 Max von Laue, Nobel Prize, physics 1914

See also
 Fraunhofer-Gesellschaft
 Gottfried Wilhelm Leibniz Scientific Community
 Harnack medal
 Helmholtz Association of German Research Centres
 Schloss Ringberg

References

Citations

Sources 

 Alison Abbott: German science starts facing up to its historical amnesia, in: Nature Vol 403 (2000), S.474f. (article about the Commission for the history of the Kaiser-Wilhelm-Gesellschaft under National Socialism)
 Gretchen Vogel: Aufbau Ost: Max Planck's East German Experiment, in: Science Vol. 326, 6. November 2009 (about the new institutes in the eastern part of Germany)

External links

 

 
1911 establishments in Germany
Scientific organisations based in Germany
Scientific organizations established in 1911
Organisations based in Munich